Frank O'Sullivan (born 1954) is an Irish retired hurler who played as a goalkeeper for the Cork senior team.

Born in Blackpool, Cork, O'Sullivan first arrived on the inter-county scene at the age of seventeen when he first linked up with the Cork minor team before later joining the under-21 side. He joined the senior panel during the 1986 championship. O'Sullivan was largely an unused substitute during his career, however, he did win one All-Ireland medal and one Munster medal as a non-playing substitute.

At club level O'Sullivan is a one-time All-Ireland medallist with Glen Rovers. In addition to this he also won one Munster medals and one championship medal.

O'Sullivan's retirement came following the conclusion of the 1987 championship.

Honours

Glen Rovers
All-Ireland Senior Club Hurling Championship: 1977
Munster Senior Club Hurling Championship: 1977
Cork Senior Hurling Championship: 1976
Cork Under-21 Hurling Championship: 1974
Cork Minor Hurling Championship: 1971, 1972

Cork
All-Ireland Senior Hurling Championship: 1986
Munster Senior Hurling Championship: 1986
All-Ireland Minor Hurling Championship: 1971
All-Ireland Under-21 Hurling Championship: 1973
Munster Under-21 Hurling Championship: 1973, 1975
Munster Minor Hurling Championship: 1971, 1972

References

1954 births
Living people
Glen Rovers hurlers
Cork inter-county hurlers